The Federation of Fighting Youth (also called FMW) was a radical anticommunist organization of Polish youth, existing in the mid and late 1980s. It was founded in June 1984 in Warsaw's district of Grochów by a group of high school students. 

In September 1984, a "Riot" (Bunt) underground publication informed about creation of the Federation, it also featured an appeal to Polish youth. The Federation's activists published their own magazine, called Information Service of the FMW (Serwis Informacyjny FMW). It was printed in the format of a samizdat, in the period November 1984 - May 1985. In October 1984, high school students in Gdańsk founded their own branch of the Federation, and began publishing their own biweekly Monit. 

In October 1985, a group of activists of the FMW decided to create the so-called Activity Groups (Grupy Wykonawcze), which began to actively fight the Communist system, by painting slogans on walls, distributing leaflets, and persecuting members of Communist apparatus of repression. The FMW gathered not only high school students, but also college students, as well as laborers. At the beginning of 1985, the Federation got its own printing press, and quickly established itself in numerous Polish towns and cities. Altogether, it had around 1,000 members, and was regarded as an open platform for those who wished for a free and democratic Poland. The FMW organized underground lectures, and distributed underground press among Polish youth. It collected money for incarcerated members of opposition, also helped families whose members were in prisons. It closely cooperated with such organizations, as Independent Students Union, Solidarity, Fighting Solidarity, and Solidarity Citizens' Committee. In the 1980s, the FMW was under surveillance of the Communist secret services. Among its major centers were Kraków, Gdansk, Warsaw, and Lodz, and FMW's members were famous for their anticommunist radicalism.

The Federation ceased to exist in 1989.

Most famous activists 
 Tomasz Arabski, now director of prime minister Donald Tusk's office,
 Sławomir Cenckiewicz, now a professional historian,
 Krzysztof Kwiatkowski, now deputy minister of justice,
 Bogdan Rymanowski, now a journalist of TVN 24,

Sources 
 Artykul

See also 
 Confederation of Independent Poland (Konfederacja Polski Niepodległej)
 Freedom and Peace (Wolność i Pokój)
 Orange Alternative (Pomarańczowa Alternatywa)

Polish dissident organisations
National liberation movements
Solidarity (Polish trade union)
Youth organizations established in the 1980s